is a Japanese two-part animated fantasy film based on The Seven Deadly Sins manga series written and illustrated by Nakaba Suzuki, and the third and fourth film for the series, following Prisoners of the Sky (2018) and Cursed by Light (2021). The two-part film is directed by Bob Shirahata, with Noriyuki Abe as chief director, written by Rintarō Ikeda, co-produced by Alfred Imageworks and Marvy Jack and distributed by Netflix. The first film was streamed on December 20, 2022, while the second film will be streamed on August 2023.

Synopsis

Part One
14 years after Kingdom of Liones defeated the Demon Clan, Meliodas’ son, Tristan is tormented by his inability to control his powers from the Demon Clan and Goddess Clan. When his mother, Elizabeth's life is endangered, Tristan heads to Edinburgh to seek a former Holy Knight, Deathpierce.

Part Two
TBA

Voice cast

Production
In November 2021, it was announced that The Seven Deadly Sins manga series will receive a two-part anime film for Netflix in 2022, with Bob Shirahata directing the film at both Alfred Imageworks and Marvy Jack, while Rinatō Ikeda is returning to provide the screenplay after writing Cursed by Light film. The two-part film will also use computer generated animation instead of hand-drawn animation. On March 2022, it was announced that key cast members will reprise their roles, along with Ayumu Murase and Mikako Komatsu being cast as teenage and young Tristan respectively. The theme song for the first film is titled "LEMONADE" by Hiroyuki Sawano and XAI.

Release
The two-part film was released on Netflix streaming site, with the first film on December 20, 2022, and the second film on August 2023.

Reception

Critical reception
Rebecca Silverman of Anime News Network gave the first film a B- rating, and stated "It's nice to reconnect with the characters and to see what their kids are up to, and overall, this feels like the start of a pretty good adventure." Kenneth Seward Jr. of IGN also thought the first film was entertaining, yet the film felt incomplete.

Notes

References

External links

2020s Japanese-language films
2022 films
2022 anime films
2023 anime films
Anime films based on manga
Anime films composed by Hiroyuki Sawano
Films directed by Noriyuki Abe
Japanese animated fantasy films
Japanese-language Netflix original films
Netflix original anime
Grudge of Edinburgh

ja:七つの大罪 (漫画)#七つの大罪 怨嗟のエジンバラ